Grande symphonie funèbre et triomphale (English: Grand Funeral and Triumphal Symphony), Op. 15, is the fourth and last symphony by the French composer Hector Berlioz, first performed on 28 July 1840 in Paris. It is one of the earliest examples of a symphony composed for military band.

Introduction
The French government commissioned the symphony for the celebrations marking the tenth anniversary of the July Revolution which had brought Louis-Philippe I to power, for which it was erecting the July Column in the Place de la Bastille. Berlioz had little sympathy for the régime, but welcomed the opportunity to write the work because the government had offered him 10,000 francs for it. The Symphonie militaire (later renamed Symphonie funèbre et triomphale), rather than following the model Berlioz had established in Romeo and Juliet, represents a reversion to an earlier pre-Beethovenian style in the tradition of monumental French public ceremonial music. Berlioz claimed to have completed the entire score in just 40 hours, harvesting much of the musical material for this Grande symphonie funèbre et triomphale from unfinished works. The first movement, the "Marche funèbre", was constructed from the Fête musicale funèbre à la mémoire des hommes illustres de la France, a massive, seven-movement ceremonial piece begun in 1835 in the hopes of selling it to the French government. According to Julian Rushton, "Berlioz worked best on large projects; when he could see no future for them he preferred not to compose." He apparently abandoned the Fête musicale funèbre because he couldn't find a sponsor to commission it.

The Funereal and Triumphal Symphony was originally scored for a military band of 200 players marching in the procession accompanying the remains of those who had died fighting in the 1830 revolution on their way to reinterment beneath a memorial column erected on the site of the Bastille. On the day of the parade, little of the 3rd movement could be heard over the cheering crowds on the column when the ceremony was about to end as it was about to be reprised while the 1st and 3rd movements were heard during the procession and the 2nd during the dedication proper; but the work was such a success at the dress rehearsal that it was performed twice more in August and became one of the composer's most popular works during his lifetime. Berlioz revised the score in January 1842, adding an optional part for strings and a final chorus to a text by Antony Deschamps. Richard Wagner attended a performance of this new version at the Salle Vivienne on 1 February 1842. On 5 February, he told Robert Schumann that he found passages in the last movement of Berlioz's symphony so "magnificent and sublime that they can  be surpassed."

Composition of the symphony
The symphony is in three movements.

Lyrics
Berlioz commissioned Antony Deschamps in 1842 to provide lyrics to be sung by choirs at the end of the final (Apothéose) movement of the symphony.

Instrumentation
Berlioz scored the symphony for a large military band with optional choir and string instruments. The following list reflects both the number of instrumental parts and the number of musicians Berlioz intended for each instrument:

 piccolos (4 players), flutes (5 players), oboes (5 players), E clarinets (5 players), 2 B clarinets (26 players total), bass clarinets (2 players), bassoons (8 players), contrabassoon (optional)
 6 horns in F, A, E, G, D and C (12 players total), 4 trumpets in F, C and B (8 players total), 2 cornets in A, G and B (4 players total), 3 trombones (3 tenors or alto and 2 tenors, 10 players total), bass trombone (optional), 2 ophicleides (6 players total)
 2 snare drums (8 players total), timpani (optional), cymbals (3 players), bass drums, tam tam, turkish crescents
 choir and strings (both optional)

In addition to the three trombones, a solo tenor trombone appears in the second movement. The choir, if used, only appears in the final movement. The strings, if used, only appear in their entirety in the final movement, with the cellos and basses also appearing in the first movement.

Recordings
 Hector Berlioz: The Complete Works (27 CD, Warner Classics 0190295614447, 2019, disc 5), Grande symphonie funèbre et triomphale (op. 15; H 80B), Chorale Populaire de Paris; Musiciens des Gardiens de la Paix; conducted by Désiré Dondeyne (LP, Erato Records) 1959.
Grande symphonie funèbre et triomphale (op. 15; H 80B), Requiem : John Alldis Choir, London Symphony Orchestra, conducted by Sir Colin Davis (Philips 416 283-2) 1969 1970.
 Grande symphonie funèbre et triomphale (op. 15; H 80B), "La Voie Triomphale": Staff Band of the Norwegian Armed Forces, conducted by Ole Kristian Ruud 2012.
Grande symphonie funèbre et triomphale (op. 15; H 80B), The Wallace Collection, conducted by John Wallace . CD Nimbus records 1989.
Grande symphonie funèbre et triomphale (op. 15; H 80B), Orchestre d'harmonie des gardiens de la paix de la Préfecture de Police de Paris, conducted by Philippe Ferro. CD Calliope 2003.
Grande symphonie funèbre et triomphale (op. 15; H 80B), Te Deum op.22, Simon Preston, organ, The BBC National Orchestra of Wales, conducted by Thierry Fisher, Susanna Mälkki. CD BBC Music Magazine 2010.

References

Notes

Sources

Further reading
Hugh Macdonald, Berlioz ("The Master Musicians", J. M. Dent, 1982)
Hector Berlioz, Memoirs (Dover, 1960) (translation of Mémoires)

External links
 

Compositions by Hector Berlioz
Choral symphonies
Symphonies for wind orchestra
1840 compositions
Funerary and memorial compositions